William Curle was a Scottish professional footballer who played in the Scottish League for Cowdenbeath, Abercorn and Albion Rovers as a centre forward. He also played in the Football League for Woolwich Arsenal.

Career statistics

Honours

Cowdenbeath Hall of Fame

References

1884 births
Scottish footballers
Association football forwards
Footballers from Glasgow
Cowdenbeath F.C. players
Rutherglen Glencairn F.C. players
Abercorn F.C. players
Scottish Football League players
Albion Rovers F.C. players
Year of death missing
Bathgate F.C. players
Renton F.C. players
Arsenal F.C. players
English Football League players
Scottish Junior Football Association players